Muhammed Zeki Uçan is a Turkish curler.

Teams

Men's

Mixed doubles

References

External links

Living people
Turkish male curlers
Date of birth missing (living people)
Place of birth missing (living people)
Year of birth missing (living people)
21st-century Turkish people